Ardan may refer to:

Places
 Ardan, a name of the eastern part of the Caucasus region

Iran
 Ardan, Iran, a city in Semnan Province, Iran
 Ardan, Yazd, a village in Yazd Province, Iran

Ireland
 Ardan, County Offaly, a townland in the civil parish of Kilbride, barony of Ballycowan
 Ardan, County Westmeath, a townland in the civil parish of Rahugh, barony of Moycashel

Romania
 Ardan, a village in Şieu Commune, Bistriţa-Năsăud County, Romania

Other
 Ardan (horse), French Thoroughbred racehorse
 Ardán, an Irish chat show
 Ardan, a character in the Vampire The Masquerade: Redemption video game, Tremere vampire and owner of the Ardan's Chantry
 Ardan, a character in the game Vainglory